Pool 2 of the Second Round of the 2009 World Baseball Classic was held at Dolphin Stadium, Miami Gardens, Florida, United States from March 14 to 18, 2009.

Like the first round, Pool 2 was a modified double-elimination tournament. The final two teams played against each other for seeding and both advanced to the semifinals.

Bracket

Results
All times are Eastern Daylight Time (UTC−04:00).

Venezuela 3, Netherlands 1

Puerto Rico 11, United States 1

United States 9, Netherlands 3

Venezuela 2, Puerto Rico 0

United States 6, Puerto Rico 5

Venezuela 10, United States 6

External links
Official website

Pool 2
World Baseball Classic Pool 2
Baseball competitions in Florida
International baseball competitions hosted by the United States
International sports competitions in Florida
World Baseball Classic Pool 2
World Baseball Classic Pool 2